This is a list of electric power industry sectors in every country or region around the world.

Africa
 Electricity sector in DR Congo
 Electricity sector in Ethiopia
 Electricity sector in Ghana
 Electricity sector in Kenya
 Electricity sector in Nigeria
 Electricity sector in South Africa

Asia
 Electricity sector in Bangladesh
 Electricity sector in Brunei
 Electricity sector in China
 Electricity sector in Hong Kong
 Electricity sector in Macau
 Electricity sector in India
 Electricity sector in Japan
 Electricity sector in Mongolia
 Electricity sector in North Korea
 Electricity sector in Pakistan
 Electricity sector in the Philippines
 Electricity sector in Singapore
 Electricity sector in South Korea
 Electricity sector in Sri Lanka
 Electricity sector in Taiwan
 Electricity sector in Turkey

Middle East
 Electricity sector in Egypt
 Electricity sector in Iran
 Electricity sector in Iraq
 Electricity sector in Saudi Arabia

Europe
 Electricity sector in Belgium
 Electricity sector in the Czech Republic
 Electricity sector in Denmark
 Electricity sector in Estonia
 Electricity sector in Finland
 Electricity sector in France
 Electricity sector in Germany
 Electricity sector in Iceland
 Electricity sector in Ireland
 Electricity sector in Italy
 Electrical energy in Kosovo
 Electricity sector in Luxembourg
 Electricity sector in the Netherlands
 Electricity sector in Norway
 Electricity sector in Russia
 Electricity sector in Spain
 Electricity sector in Sweden
 Electricity sector in Switzerland
 Electricity sector in Turkey
 Electricity sector in the United Kingdom
 Green electricity in the United Kingdom

North America
 Electricity sector in Canada
 History of electricity sector in Canada
 Electricity sector in the Dominican Republic
 Electricity sector in El Salvador
 Electricity sector in Haiti
 Electricity sector in Honduras
 Electricity sector in Mexico
 Electricity sector in Nicaragua
 Electricity sector of the United States

Oceania
 Electricity sector in Australia
 Green electricity in Australia
 History of electricity supply in Queensland
 Electricity sector in New Zealand
 Renewable electricity in New Zealand

South America
 Electricity sector in Argentina
 Electricity sector in Brazil
 Electricity sector in Chile
 Electricity sector in Colombia
 Electricity sector in Cuba
 Electricity sector in Guyana
 Electricity sector in Paraguay
 Electricity sector in Peru
 Electricity sector in Uruguay
 Electricity sector in Venezuela

See also
 Electric power industry
 List of power stations

Sectors
sectors
electricity sectors